Thompsonville is a village in Benzie County in the U.S. state of Michigan.  The population was 441 at the 2010 census. The village is located in the south of the county on the boundary between Weldon Township and Colfax Township.

Geography

Origin
Thompsonville was established when construction of the lines of two railroads, the Chicago & West Michigan and the Frankfort & South Eastern, crossed here in 1889. The village was platted by and named for Stacy C. Thompson (1856-1944), a Manistee, Michigan real estate agent who dealt in properties in Manistee, Mason, Benzie, Wexford and Grand Traverse Counties. Of the two railroads serving the village, the Chicago & West Michigan was merged into the Pere Marquette Railway in 1900 and the Chesapeake & Ohio Railway in 1947, while the Frankfort & South Eastern was acquired in 1892 by the Toledo, Ann Arbor & North Michigan, which in turn was reorganized in 1895 as the Ann Arbor Railroad.

Points of interest
Thompsonville is best known for the ski resort located there, Crystal Mountain.
Thompsonville is also known for its distillery, Iron Fish Distillery.
Thompsonville also have Diamond Cross Between AA Railroad and C&O Railway. But in 1982, C&O Railway made its last train through Thompsonville before the closure. 9 Years later in 1991, Tuscola and Saginaw Bay Railway train was the last train through Thompsonville. Today, The diamond somehow survived from dismantling of railroad tracks and moved, It can be seen with Caboose on tracks
Once recognized as one of the premier cafe's in America. The Kountry Kettle in Thompsonville, MI is now recognized as a historical landmark. Visited frequently by historians and social media influencers to this day.

Demographics

2010 census
As of the census of 2010, there were 441 people, 183 households, and 112 families living in the village. The racial makeup of the village was 94.8% White, 0.2% African American, 2.5% Native American, 0.2% Asian, 0.2% from other races, and 2.0% from two or more races. Hispanic or Latino of any race were 1.4% of the population.

There were 183 households, of which 28.4% had children under the age of 18 living with them, 37.2% were married couples living together, 16.4% had a female householder with no husband present, 7.7% had a male householder with no wife present, and 38.8% were non-families. 30.6% of all households were made up of individuals, and 12.6% had someone living alone who was 65 years of age or older. The average household size was 2.41 and the average family size was 2.99.

The median age in the village was 38.5 years. 23.1% of residents were under the age of 18; 9.1% were between the ages of 18 and 24; 28.1% were from 25 to 44; 24% were from 45 to 64; and 15.6% were 65 years of age or older. The gender makeup of the village was 49.9% male and 50.1% female.

2000 census
As of the census of 2000, there were 457 people, 180 households, and 120 families living in the village. The racial makeup of the village was 96.06% White, 2.41% Native American, 0.22% Asian, 1.09% from other races, and 0.22% from two or more races. Hispanic or Latino of any race were 0.22% of the population.

There were 180 households, out of which 34.4% had children under the age of 18 living with them, 47.2% were married couples living together, 13.9% had a female householder with no husband present, and 33.3% were non-families. 28.9% of all households were made up of individuals, and 15.0% had someone living alone who was 65 years of age or older.  The average household size was 2.54 and the average family size was 3.12.

In the village, the population was spread out, with 28.4% under the age of 18, 8.3% from 18 to 24, 27.6% from 25 to 44, 21.4% from 45 to 64, and 14.2% who were 65 years of age or older.  The median age was 35 years. For every 100 females, there were 101.3 males.  For every 100 females age 18 and over, there were 99.4 males.

The median income for a household in the village was $29,125, and the median income for a family was $31,103. Males had a median income of $22,500 versus $18,250 for females. The per capita income for the village was $12,104.  About 12.8% of families and 13.3% of the population were below the poverty line, including 24.3% of those under age 18 and 7.1% of those age 65 or over.

Notable People

Josh Hockman, Chris Meredith, Matt Smith, Matt Krimm, Krissi Moll, Emily O’Brien, Jeremy Krimm, Nathan Smith, TJ Windrim, Hank Spafford.

Climate
This climatic region has large seasonal temperature differences, with warm to hot (and often humid) summers and cold (sometimes severely cold) winters. According to the Köppen Climate Classification system, Thompsonville has a humid continental climate, abbreviated "Dfb" on climate maps.

References

Villages in Benzie County, Michigan
Villages in Michigan
Traverse City micropolitan area